The Soho Loop is a  section of the eighteenth-century Old BCN Main Line canal in Birmingham, England, about  west of the city centre, which opened to traffic on 6 November 1769, and was bypassed in September 1827 by a straight  section of the New BCN Main Line. This is all that remains of the former Soho Branch that once served Matthew Boulton's Soho Manufactory. There is pedestrian access to a tow path for the entire length of the outside of the loop, which skirts the southern boundary of Winson Green Prison and twice passes underneath the Stour Valley Railway. The Centre of the Earth environmental education centre is adjacent to the canal and has a long wharf frontage.

See also

Icknield Port Loop

References

Birmingham Canal Navigations
Canals in the West Midlands (county)
Canals in England
History of Birmingham, West Midlands
Canals opened in 1769